The National Academy of Management is a higher educational establishment in Kyiv, Ukraine. It was founded in 1992.

Majors
Finances;
Banking;
Accounting and Audit;
Marketing;
Law;
Intelligence systems of decision-making (in economics and business).

References

Universities and colleges in Kyiv
Educational institutions established in 1992
Private universities and colleges in Ukraine
1992 establishments in Ukraine
Institutions with the title of National in Ukraine